"Coming Home" is a song by German singer Sasha. It was written and produced by Sasha along with Robin Grubert and Alexander Zuckowski for Sasha's first compilation album Greatest Hits (2006). Released as the album's lead single, it reached the top ten of the German Singles Chart.

Track listing

Charts

Weekly charts

Year-end charts

References

External links 
 

2006 singles
2006 songs
Sasha (German singer) songs
Warner Music Group singles